Wilhelma (originally Wilhelma-Hamîdije) was German Templer Colony in Palestine located southwest of al-'Abbasiyyah near Jaffa. 

Wilhelma-Hamîdije was named in honour of King William II of Württemberg, Emperor Wilhelm II and Sultan Abdul Hamid II, however, only the first half of the name prevailed. Wilhelma was established by German settlers in 1902 in Palestine then under Ottoman rule. 

In July 1918, the German residents of Wilhelma were interned at Helouan, near Cairo in Egypt. They were returned to Palestine in January 1921.

During the inter-war years the colony produced dairy goods and wine in collaboration with the German colony at Sarona.

At the time of the 1922 census of Palestine, Wilhelma had a population of 186 Christians, 36 Muslims and 1 Jew. By the 1931 census, there were 319 residents in 65 occupied houses, the population consisted of 231 Christians, 84 Muslims, and 4 Jews.

During World War II, Wilhelma was transformed into an internment camp by the British Mandatory authorities where German settlers from Wilhelma and other localities such as Sarona as well as other enemy aliens (such as Hungarians and Italians) were concentrated and held. In World War II, guarded by Jewish police, the camp was under an early night curfew. Detainees were held there until April 1948 when the last of them were moved out to Germany or resettled in Australia.  

Three Jewish moshav settlements were established on this land in 1948.  The first was abandoned on May 15, 1948 after being overrun by the Arab Legion.  The second was established by a Hapoel HaMizrachi group.   The third was established by the Tehiya group of the Hapoel HaMizrachi.

Wilhelma is now the site of the Israeli locality of Bnei Atarot. 

What is now Israel's Ben Gurion International Airport was originally named "Lydda Airport" when it was built in 1934 near the Templer community. It was renamed RAF Station Lydda in 1943. During World War II it served as a major airfield for military air transport and aircraft ferry operations between military bases in Europe, Africa, the Middle East (mainly Iraq and Persia) and South/Southeast Asia.

References

Bibliography

Populated places established in 1902
Templer settlements
Hevel Modi'in Regional Council
Geography of Central District (Israel)
1902 establishments in the Ottoman Empire
1948 disestablishments in Mandatory Palestine